Coloradia prchali or Prchal's pinemoth, is a species of hemileucine silkmoth (Saturniidae) from eastern Sonora and western Chihuahua in the Sierra Madre Occidental pine–oak forests. Its habitat includes conifer-oak forest composed of Pinus ponderosa, Pinus engelmannii, Pinus leiophylla, Juniperus deppeana, Quercus arizonica, Quercus grisea and Quercus viminea.

References

Saturniidae